This article lists various team and individual football records in relation to the Belgium national team (The Red Devils). The page currently shows the records as of 1 December 2022.

Team records

Wins
 Largest win
10–1 vs  on 28 February 2001
9–0 vs  Zambia on 4 June 1994
9–0 vs  on 31 August 2017
9–0 vs  on 10 October 2019
 Largest away win
6–0 vs  on 14 October 1986
6–0 vs  on 10 October 2016
 Largest win at the World Cup Finals
3–0 vs  on 3 June 1970, 1970 World Cup
3–0 vs  on 18 June 2018, 2018 World Cup
5–2 vs  on 23 June 2018, 2018 World Cup
 Largest win at the European Championship finals 4–0 vs  on 26 June 2016, Euro 2016
 Largest win at the Olympic Games finals 3–0 vs  on 31 August 1920, 1920 Summer Olympics
 Largest goal deficit overcome in a single game (to either a win or a draw) 3 goals, vs  on 6 May 1932 (4–3 victory after being 0–3 down)

Draws

 Highest scoring draw 5–5 vs  on 4 September 1999
 Highest scoring draw at the World Cup Finals 4–4  vs  on 17 June 1954, 1954 World Cup
 Highest scoring draw at the European Championship finals  1–1 vs  on 12 June 1980, Euro 1980
 Highest scoring draw at the Olympic Games finals None

Defeats

 Largest defeat 2–11 vs  England Amateurs on 17 April 1909
Including unofficial games: 0–12 vs  Corinthian on 6 January 1906
 Largest defeat at home 1–9 vs  on 11 May 1927
 Largest defeat at the World Cup Finals 
 0–3 vs  United States on 13 July 1930, 1930 World Cup
 2–5 vs  Germany on 27 May 1934, 1934 World Cup
 1–4 vs  on 20 June 1954, 1954 World Cup
 1–4 vs  on 6 June 1970, 1970 World Cup
 0–3 vs  on 28 June 1982, 1982 World Cup
 Largest defeat at the European Championship finals 0–5 vs  on 16 June 1984, Euro 1984

 Largest defeat at the Olympic Games finals 1–8 vs  on 29 May 1924, 1924 Summer Olympics
 Largest lead given away  2 goals, on several occasions

Goals

Scored
 Most goals scored in a single game 10 vs  on 28 February 2001
 Most goals scored in an away game 7 vs  on 25 November 1951
 Most goals scored during the first half 7 vs  on 5 June 1957
 Most goals scored during the second half 7 vs  on 28 February 2001
 Most goals scored during extra time 
 2 vs  on 15 June 1986
 2 vs  on 1 July 2014
 Most goals scored in a single game during the World Cup finals 5 vs  on 23 June 2018, 2018 World Cup Cup
 Most goals scored in a single game during the European Championship finals 4 vs  on 26 June 2016, Euro 2016

 Most goals scored in a single game during the Olympic Games finals 5 vs  on 27 May 1928, 1928 Summer Olympics
 Most different players scoring during a single game 7 (+ 1 own goal) (Romelu Lukaku (2), Nacer Chadli, Toby Alderweireld, Youri Tielemans, Christian Benteke, Yari Verschaeren and Timothy Castagne) (+ own goal by Cristian Brolli), vs  on 10 October 2019

Conceded
 Most goals conceded in a single game 11 vs  England Amateurs on 17 April 1909
Including unofficial games: 12 vs  Corinthian on 6 January 1906
 Most goals conceded during a home game 9 vs  on 11 May 1927
 Most goals conceded during the first half 8 vs  England Amateurs on 17 April 1909
 Most goals conceded during the second half 
 6 vs  England Amateurs on 24 February 1914
 6 vs  Germany on 22 October 1933
 6 vs  on 27 February 1938
 6 vs  on 14 October 1951
 6 vs  on 13 April 1958
 Most goals conceded during extra time 3 vs  on 30 April 1905
 Most goals conceded in a single game during the World Cup Finals  5 vs  Germany on 27 May 1934, 1934 World Cup
 Most goals conceded in a single game during the European Championship Finals 5 vs  on 16 June 1984, Euro 1984
 Most goals conceded in a single game during the Olympic Games finals 8 vs  on 29 May 1924, 1924 Summer Olympics

Scored and conceded
 Highest total number of goals in a single game
 13: 2–11 defeat against  England Amateurs on 17 April 1909

 13: 7–6 victory against  on 25 November 1951

Streaks
 Longest unbeaten run 23 games, from 2016 to 2018
 Longest run without victory 13, from 1933 to 1935
 Most consecutive wins 12, from 2019 to 2020
 Most consecutive draws 4, from 1948 to 1949, and in 1998
 Most consecutive losses 7, from 1927 to 1928
 Most consecutive games with at least one goal scored 49, from 2018 to 2022
 Most consecutive games without a goal scored 5, in 1999
 Most consecutive games without a goal conceded 7, in 2019
 Most consecutive games with at least one goal conceded 38, from 1928 to 1933

World rankings

FIFA
Source: FIFA.com

 Highest FIFA ranking 1st (November 2015 – March 2016, September 2018 – February 2022)
 Lowest FIFA ranking 71st (June 2007)
 Best Mover +25 (April 2011)
 Worst Mover −14 (September 2010)

Elo
Source: Eloratings.net
 Highest Elo rating 2158 (following 1–0 vs  on 27 June 2021)
 Lowest Elo rating 1497 (following 0–8 vs  on 29 March 1936)
 Highest Elo ranking 1st (16 November 2019 – 11 October 2020, 27 June 2021, 2 September 2021 – 8 September 2021)
 Lowest Elo ranking 74th (September 2009)

Achievements

Major titles

  Olympic football tournament
Gold Medal  (1): 1920

Friendly trophies

 Évence Coppée Trophy
Shared (1): 1904

 Challenge Frédéric Vanden Abeele
Winners (3): 1906, 1922, 1925
Shared (3): 1913, 1921, 1924

 Rotterdamsch Nieuwsblad-beker
Winners (5): 1906, 1907, 1913, 1922, 1926
Shared (5): 1923, 1924, 1928 (2x), 1930

 Kirin Cup
Shared (1): 1999

Awards
 FIFA Team of the Year
Winners (5): 2015, 2018, 2019, 2020, 2021
 FIFA Fair Play Trophy
Winners (1): 2002
Belgian National Sports Merit Award
Winners (1): 1980
 Belgian Sportsteam of the Year
Winners (2): 2013, 2014

Other achievements

 FIFA World Cup
Third place (1): 2018
Fourth place (1): 1986
 UEFA European Championship
Runners-up (1): 1980
Third place (1): 1972
 UEFA Nations League
Fourth place (1): 2021

Individual
 For individual recognitions at major tournaments, see FIFA World Cup awards and UEFA European Championship Teams of the Tournament.
 All players with at least 35 caps are awarded a Medal of Recognition by the Royal Belgian Football Association; also players whose careers are ended by an injury after twenty games receive this award.

Appearances

General

Most appearances
Jan Vertonghen (2007–present), 145 caps

The following are the top ten most capped players; players with an equal number of caps are ranked in chronological order of reaching the milestone:

. The records are collected based on data from FIFA and RSSSF. Highlighted names denote a player still playing or available for selection.

 Most consecutive appearances Louis Carré, 50 games, from 22 May 1949 (vs ) until 11 March 1956 (vs )
 Most appearances as a substitute Dries Mertens, 40 caps
 Most times substituted off Eden Hazard, 58 caps
 Most games started on the bench Simon Mignolet, 88 games
 Most selections (playing + non-playing) Jan Vertonghen, 152 selections
 Most selections as an unused substitute Simon Mignolet, 94 selections
 Most selections as an unused substitute without ever earning a cap Jacques Duquesne, 16 selections
 Most selections needed to earn first cap Koen Casteels, 37 selections
 Lowest caps to selections ratio (> 0) Koen Casteels (still active), 4/58 & Jean Valet, 1/19
 Most selections without ever being an unused substitute Wesley Sonck, 55 selections
 Most appearances as a substitute without ever starting a game Tom Soetaers, 8 caps
 Most appearances while never playing an entire game Adnan Januzaj (still active), 15 caps & Tom Soetaers, 8 caps
 Most appearances in the starting eleven Jan Vertonghen, 137 caps
 Most caps earned while not playing the entire game Dries Mertens, 89 caps
 Most caps earned while only playing entire games Bernard Voorhoof, 61 caps
 Most caps earned while playing an entire game Jan Vertonghen, 123 caps
 Most caps without ever being substituted off Georges Heylens, 67 caps
 Most caps without ever appearing as a substitute Eric Gerets, 86 caps
 Most caps needed to first play an entire game Romelu Lukaku, 24 caps
 Most caps needed to first appear in the starting eleven Mbo Mpenza, 9 caps

 First player to reach a century of caps Jan Vertonghen, vs  on 2 June 2018
 Shortest time needed to reach a century of caps Eden Hazard, 10 years, 4 months and 5 days between his debut (vs  on 19 November 2008) and his 100th cap (vs  on 24 March 2019)
 Longest Belgian career Hector Goetinck, 6,402 days or 17 years, 6 months and 10 days between first (vs  on 22 April 1906) and last cap (vs  on 1 November 1923)
 Shortest Belgian career Joris Van Hout, 2 minutes (on 16 October 2002 vs )
 Most consecutive calendar years of appearances Jan Vertonghen (2007–2022), 16 years
 Longest wait between appearances Hector Goetinck, 3,476 days or 9 years, 6 months and 27 days, between his 16th (vs  on 26 April 1914) and his 17th and final cap (vs  on 1 November 1923) 
 Appearances in three separate decades
 Georges Hebdin; 3 in the 1900s, 6 in the 1910s and 3 in 1920
 Hector Goetinck; 6 in the 1900s, 10 in the 1910s and 1 in 1923
 Bernard Voorhoof; 3 in 1928, 56 in the 1930s and 2 in 1940 
 Vic Mees; 6 in 1949, 57 in the 1950s and 5 in 1960 
 Wilfried Van Moer; 14 in the 1960s, 25 in the 1970s and 18 in the 1980s 
 Jan Ceulemans; 10 in the 1970s, 75 in the 1980s and 11 in the 1990s
 Michel Preud'homme; 1 in 1979, 17 in the 1980s and 41 in the 1990s 
 Eric Gerets; 19 in the 1970s, 57 in the 1980s and 10 in the 1990s 
 Erwin Vandenbergh; 1 in 1979, 43 in the 1980s and 4 in the 1990s 
 Filip De Wilde; 1 in 1989, 26 in the 1990s and 6 in 2000 
 Danny Boffin; 2 in 1989, 39 in the 1990s and 14 in the 2000s 
 Luc Nilis; 9 in the 1980s, 42 in the 1990s and 5 in 2000 
 Jan Vertonghen; 20 in the 2000s, 98 in the 2010s and 27 in the 2020s
 Axel Witsel; 10 in the 2000s, 95 in the 2010s and 25 in the 2020s
 Toby Alderweireld; 4 in the 2000s, 94 in the 2010s and 29 in the 2020s
 Thomas Vermaelen; 27 in the 2000s, 51 in the 2010s and 7 in the 2020s
 Eden Hazard; 10 in the 2000s, 96 in the 2010s and 20 in the 2020s
 Smallest number of caps needed to appear in three separate decades Georges Hebdin, 10 caps (total number of caps obtained: 12)
 First player to debut as a substitute Louis Van Hege, vs  on 9 March 1919
 Most times completed a game of 120 minutes Jan Ceulemans & Stéphane Demol, 4 games, both at the 1986 and 1990 World Cups
 First appearance by a player who was playing abroad Raymond Braine (Sparta Prague,  Czechoslovakia), vs  on 14 April 1935
 First appearance by a player who had never played for the senior team of a Belgian club Thomas Buffel, vs  on 12 October 2002
 First appearance by a player born outside Belgium Eric Thornton (born in ), vs  on 30 April 1905 
 First appearance by a player born outside of Europe Luís Oliveira (born in ), vs  on 26 February 1992
 Last appearance by a player from a Belgian club outside the top division Jan Verheyen (Union SG), Belgian Third Division, vs  on 25 April 1976 
 Last appearance by a player from outside the top division of any country Radja Nainggolan (Piacenza),  Italian Serie B, vs  on 29 May 2009
 Players who have never played for the first team of a Belgian club Thomas Vermaelen, Eden Hazard, Divock Origi, Adnan Januzaj, Yannick Carrasco, Jason Denayer, Koen Casteels, Orel Mangala and Amadou Onana
 Most appearances without ever playing for the first team of a Belgian club Eden Hazard, 126 caps 
 Most appearances while active with a non-Belgian club Jan Vertonghen (Ajax, Tottenham Hotspur & Benfica), 139 caps
 Players appearing against the country of their birth 
 Stanley Vanden Eynde vs  on 3 May 1931, 9 April 1933, 7 May 1933, 2 May 1937, and 27 February 1938
 Erwin Vandendaele vs  on 15 November 1970, 12 October 1974 and 15 November 1975
 Branko Strupar vs  on 2 September 2000
 Highest number of players born outside Belgium simultaneously on the field 3 (Luís Oliveira, Gordan Vidović & Mbo Mpenza) vs  on 27 May 1998
 Players also appearing for another senior national team 
 Players capped while active outside of Europe 
 Émile Mpenza: Al Rayyan, 3 caps
 Laurent Ciman: Montreal Impact, 10 caps & Los Angeles FC, 1 cap
 Axel Witsel: Tianjin Quanjian, 16 caps
 Yannick Carrasco: Dalian Yifang, 19 caps
 Thomas Vermaelen: Vissel Kobe, 11 caps
 Toby Alderweireld: Al-Duhail, 8 caps

Age-related
 Youngest player Fernand Nisot, aged 16 years and 19 days, on 30 April 1911 vs 
The following are all the players who debuted for the national football team of Belgium before the age of 18, their team at that time and their usual position:

 Oldest player Timmy Simons, aged 39 years, 11 months and 2 days, vs  on 13 November 2016
The following are the top ten oldest players for the national football team of Belgium, their team at that time and their usual position:

Highlighted names denote a player still playing or available for selection.

 Youngest goalkeeper Robert Hustin, aged 18 years, 6 months and 24 days, vs  on 9 May 1905
 Youngest player to reach a century of caps Eden Hazard, aged 28 years, 2 months and 17 days, vs  on 24 March 2019
 Oldest debutant Dany Verlinden, aged 34 years, 10 months and 7 days, vs  on 25 March 1998
 Oldest outfield debutant Jozef Van Looy, aged 34 years, 2 months and 16 days, vs  on 18 May 1950
 Oldest player to feature at the World Cup finals Wilfried Van Moer, aged 37 years, 3 months and 27 days, 1982 World Cup, vs  on 28 June 1982
 Youngest player to feature at the World Cup finals Divock Origi, aged 19 years, 1 month and 30 days, 2014 World Cup, vs  on 17 June 2014
 Oldest player to feature at the European Championship finals Lorenzo Staelens, aged 36 years, 1 months and 20 days, Euro 2000, vs  on 19 June 2000
 Youngest player to feature at the European Championship finals Enzo Scifo, aged 18 years, 3 months and 25 days, Euro 1984, vs  on 13 June 1984

On major tournaments
 Most inclusions in a World Cup/European Championship finals squad Jan Ceulemans (Euro 1980, 1982 World Cup, Euro 1984, 1986 World Cup and 1990 World Cup), Enzo Scifo (Euro 1984, 1986 World Cup, 1990 World Cup, 1994 World Cup and 1998 World Cup), Marc Wilmots (1990 World Cup, 1994 World Cup, 1998 World Cup, Euro 2000 and 2002 World Cup), Toby Alderweireld, Thibaut Courtois, Kevin De Bruyne, Eden Hazard, Romelu Lukaku, Dries Mertens, Simon Mignolet, Jan Vertonghen and Axel Witsel (2014 World Cup, Euro 2016, 2018 World Cup, Euro 2020 and 2022 World Cup), 5 tournaments
 Most tournaments appeared in Jan Ceulemans (Euro 1980, 1982 World Cup, Euro 1984, 1986 World Cup, 1990 World Cup), Enzo Scifo (Euro 1984, 1986 World Cup, 1990 World Cup, 1994 World Cup and 1998 World Cup), Toby Alderweireld, Thibaut Courtois, Kevin De Bruyne, Eden Hazard, Romelu Lukaku, Dries Mertens, Jan Vertonghen and Axel Witsel (2014 World Cup, Euro 2016, 2018 World Cup, Euro 2020 and 2022 World Cup), 5 tournaments
 Most tournaments appeared in consecutively Toby Alderweireld, Thibaut Courtois, Kevin De Bruyne, Eden Hazard, Romelu Lukaku, Dries Mertens, Jan Vertonghen and Axel Witsel (all played at 2014 World Cup, Euro 2016, 2018 World Cup, Euro 2020 and 2022 World Cup), 5 tournaments
 Most total appearances at the World Cup and European Championship finals Thibaut Courtois, 25 caps
 Most total non-playing selections for the World Cup and European Championship finals Simon Mignolet, 24 selections
 Most total non-playing selections for the World Cup and European Championship finals without ever playing in a tournament Simon Mignolet, 24 selections (still active) & Gilbert Bodart, 11 selections
 Most appearances without ever playing at the World Cup finals or the European Championship finals Jef Jurion, 64 caps
 Fewest appearances while still playing at both the World Cup finals and European Championship finals Jacky Peeters & Branko Strupar, 17 caps
 Most appearances without ever being in a World Cup or European Championship finals squad Jef Jurion, 64 caps
 Most inclusions in a World Cup/European Championship finals squad without playing in the tournament Simon Mignolet (2014 World Cup, Euro 2016, 2018 World Cup, Euro 2020 and 2022 World Cup), 5 tournaments 
 Most inclusions in a World Cup/European Championship finals squad without ever playing in a tournament Simon Mignolet (2014 World Cup, Euro 2016, 2018 World Cup, Euro 2020 and 2022 World Cup), 5 tournaments 
 Most appearances at the Olympic Games finals Jean de Bie, 6 caps (3 in 1920, 1 in 1924 and 2 in 1928)
 First player to make tournament appearances in three separate decades None

FIFA World Cup
 Most inclusions in the squad for the World Cup finals Franky Van der Elst, Enzo Scifo (both in 1986, 1990, 1994 and 1998) & Marc Wilmots (1990, 1994, 1998 and 2002), 4 World Cups
 Most appearances in different World Cup finals Franky Van der Elst & Enzo Scifo (both in the 1986, 1990, 1994 and 1998), 4 World Cups
 Most appearances at the World Cup finals Enzo Scifo, 17 caps
 Most appearances without ever playing at the World Cup finals Jef Jurion, 64 caps
 Most non-playing selections for the World Cup finals Simon Mignolet, 15 selections
 Most selections for the World Cup finals without ever playing in the tournament Simon Mignolet, 15 selections
 Fewest appearances while still playing at the World Cup finals Gérard Delbeke, 1 cap
 Players to debut at the World Cup finals 
 Henri De Deken, 1930 World Cup, vs  Paraguay on 20 July 1930
 Gérard Delbeke, 1930 World Cup, vs  Paraguay on 20 July 1930
 François De Vries, 1934 World Cup, vs  Germany on 27 May 1934
 Denis Houf, 1954 World Cup, vs  on 17 June 1954
 Pieter van den Bosch, 1954 World Cup, vs  on 17 June 1954
 Guy Vandersmissen, 1982 World Cup, vs  on 13 June 1982
 Jacky Munaron, 1982 World Cup, vs  on 1 July 1982

UEFA European Championship
 Most inclusions in the squad for the European Championship finals Maurice Martens (1972 & 1980), Jan Ceulemans, Jean-Marie Pfaff, Erwin Vandenbergh, René Vandereycken (1980 & 1984), Toby Alderweireld, Michy Batshuayi, Christian Benteke, Yannick Carrasco, Thibaut Courtois, Kevin De Bruyne, Jason Denayer, Eden Hazard, Romelu Lukaku, Thomas Meunier, Dries Mertens, Simon Mignolet, Thomas Vermaelen, Jan Vertonghen & Axel Witsel (2016 & 2020), 2 final tournaments
 Most appearances at the European Championship finals Thibaut Courtois & Romelu Lukaku, 10 caps
 Most consecutive appearances at the European Championship finals Jan Ceulemans, Jean-Marie Pfaff, Erwin Vandenbergh, René Vandereycken (1980 & 1984), Toby Alderweireld, Michy Batshuayi, Christian Benteke, Yannick Carrasco, Thibaut Courtois, Kevin De Bruyne, Jason Denayer, Eden Hazard, Romelu Lukaku, Thomas Meunier, Dries Mertens, Thomas Vermaelen, Jan Vertonghen & Axel Witsel (2016 & 2020), 2 final tournaments
 Fewest appearances while still playing at the European Championship finals Walter De Greef & Paul Lambrichts, 5 caps
 Most appearances without ever playing at the European Championship finals Timmy Simons, 94 caps
 Appearances at most European Championship finals Jan Ceulemans, Jean-Marie Pfaff, Erwin Vandenbergh, René Vandereycken (1980 & 1984), Toby Alderweireld, Michy Batshuayi, Christian Benteke, Yannick Carrasco, Thibaut Courtois, Kevin De Bruyne, Jason Denayer, Eden Hazard, Romelu Lukaku, Thomas Meunier, Dries Mertens, Thomas Vermaelen, Jan Vertonghen & Axel Witsel (2016 & 2020), 2 final tournaments
 Most non-playing selections for the European Championship finals Simon Mignolet, 9 selections
 Most non-playing selections for the European Championship finals without ever playing in the tournament Simon Mignolet, 9 selections
 Players to debut at the European Championship finals Georges Grün, Euro 1984, vs  on 13 June 1984

Goals

General

 First goal Georges Quéritet vs  on 1 May 1904	

 Most goals Romelu Lukaku (2010–present), 68
 
, the top ten players with the most goals for Belgium are:

(Goalscorers with an equal number of goals are ranked with the highest to lowest goals per game ratio.)

The records are collected based on data from FIFA and RSSSF. Highlighted names denote a player still playing or available for selection.

 Players with the highest goals per game ratio (greater than one)

, the players with the highest goals per game ratio (greater than one) for Belgium are:

(Players with an equal goals per game ratio are ranked by the most goals scored.)

The records are collected based on data from FIFA and RSSSF. Highlighted names denote a player still playing or available for selection.

 Most goals in competitive matches Romelu Lukaku, 46

 Most consecutive matches scored in Jef Mermans, 7
 Most consecutive matches scored in starting with debut Alphonse Six & Maurice Willems, 3 each
 Most goals on debut Josip Weber, 5 goals vs  Zambia on 4 June 1994
 Most matches played while scoring in each one Maurice Willems, 3
 Most goals in a single calendar year Romelu Lukaku, 14 in 2018
 Most goals scored by a defender Daniel Van Buyten, 10

 Most goals scored by a goalkeeper Christian Piot, 1
 First goal by a substitute François Van den Eynde, vs  on 25 February 1934
 Most goals scored as a substitute Michy Batshuayi, 9 
 Most goals scored by a substitute in a single game Bob Peeters, 3 goals vs  on 28 February 2001
 Most appearances without ever scoring Thibaut Courtois, 100 
 Most appearances for an outfield player without ever scoring Georges Heylens, 67
 Most appearances needed to score his first goal Franky Van der Elst, 79
 Most goals scored in extra time 
 Alphonse Six, 1 goal vs  on 13 May 1910
 Stéphane Demol, 1 goal vs  on 15 June 1986
 Nico Claesen, 1 goal vs  on 15 June 1986
 Romelu Lukaku, 1 goal vs  on 1 July 2014
 Kevin De Bruyne, 1 goal vs  on 1 July 2014
 Latest goal scored by a player Alphonse Six vs  on 13 May 1910, in the 114th minute
 Latest goal conceded by a goalkeeper in the 119th minute
 Eddy de Neve on 13 April 1905
 David Platt on 26 June 1990
 Goals in three separate decades
 Bernard Voorhoof; 1 in 1928, 28 in the 1930s and 1 in 1940
 Erwin Vandenbergh; 1 in 1979, 18 in the 1980s and 1 in 1991
 Axel Witsel; 2 in the 2000s, 7 in the 2010s and 3 in the 2020s
 First Belgian goalscorer at the King Baudouin Stadium August Hellemans (when it was still the Centenaire Stadium), Michaël Goossens (after it was renamed King Baudouin Stadium)
 Scorers of own goals Robert Hustin, Edgard Poelmans, Oscar Verbeeck, Émile Stijnen, Bob Paverick, Charles Saeys, Walter Meeuws, Régis Genaux, Philippe Albert, Timmy Simons, Olivier Deschacht, Bart Goor, Vincent Kompany and Nacer Chadli

Hat-tricks

 Most goals in a match  
Robert De Veen, 5 goals vs  on 30 April 1911
Bert De Cleyn, 5 goals vs  on 23 February 1946
Josip Weber, 5 goals vs  Zambia on 4 June 1994
Including unofficial games: Herbert Potts, 7 goals vs  Netherlands B on 28 April 1901

 Four goals in a match/Most goals in an away game  
Marc Van Der Linden, vs  on 1 June 1989

 Three goals in a match  
at 36 occasions, see the list of Belgium hat-tricks

 Most hat-tricks  Robert De Veen, 3 times
 Fastest hat-trick  Robert De Veen, 22 minutes, vs  on 30 April 1911
 Fastest hat-trick as a substitute  Bob Peeters, 30 minutes, vs  on 28 February 2001
 Youngest player to score a hat-trick  Jean Capelle, 18 years, 7 months and 10 days, vs  on 5 June 1932
 Oldest player to score a hat-trick  Josip Weber, 29 years, 6 months and 16 days, vs  Zambia on 4 June 1994
 Highest number of different players to score (at least) a hat-trick in the same game 
 2, Sylvain Brébart (3) and Jean Van Cant (3), vs  Germany on 23 November 1913
 2, Josip Weber (5) and Marc Degryse (3), vs  Zambia on 4 June 1994
 2, Thomas Meunier (3) and Romelu Lukaku (3), vs  on 31 August 2017
 Hat-tricks at major tournaments  Robert Coppée, vs  Spain on 29 August 1920 (at the 1920 Olympics)

Penalties
 First player to score a penalty  Gaston Hubin vs  on 28 January 1912
 Most goals scored from penalties  Eden Hazard, 10 goals
 Most goals in penalty shoot-outs in competitive games  Nico Claesen, Enzo Scifo, Hugo Broos, Patrick Vervoort and Leo Van der Elst, all 1 goal vs  on 22 June 1986
 Most goals in penalty shoot-outs, including friendlies
 Nico Claesen, Enzo Scifo, Hugo Broos, Patrick Vervoort and Leo Van der Elst, all 1 goal vs  on 22 June 1986
 Eric Van Meir, Vital Borkelmans, Mbo Mpenza and Philippe Vande Walle, all 1 goal vs  on 29 May 1998

Fastest

 Fastest goal from kickoff  Christian Benteke, 8.1 seconds vs  on 10 October 2016
 Fastest goal in debut match (since World War II)  Tom Caluwé, 2 minutes and 52 seconds vs  on 11 May 2006
 Fastest goal by a substitute  Marc Wilmots, 1 minute and 4 seconds vs  on 25 March 1992
 Fastest goal at the World Cup finals  Thomas Meunier, 3 minutes and 36 seconds vs  on 14 July 2018
 Fastest goal at the European Championship finals  Romelu Lukaku, 9 minutes and 30 seconds vs  on 12 June 2021

Age-related
 Oldest goalscorer  Wilfried Van Moer, 37 years, 1 month and 27 days, vs  Bulgaria on 28 April 1982
 Youngest goalscorer  Fernand Nisot, 16 years, 10 months and 27 days, vs  on 10 March 1912
 Oldest goalscorer at the World Cup finals  Lei Clijsters, 33 years, 7 months and 11 days, 1990 FIFA World Cup, vs  on 17 June 1990
 Youngest goalscorer at the World Cup finals  Divock Origi, 19 years, 2 months and 4 days, 2014 FIFA World Cup, vs  on 22 June 2014
 Oldest goalscorer at the European Championship finals  Julien Cools, 33 years, 4 months and 2 days, Euro 1980, vs  Spain on 15 June 1980
 Youngest goalscorer at the European Championship finals  Émile Mpenza, 21 years, 11 months and 6 days, Euro 2000, vs  on 10 June 2000

On major tournaments
 Most total goals at the World Cup and European Championship finals Romelu Lukaku, 11 (1 at the 2014 World Cup, 2 at Euro 2016, 4 at the 2018 World Cup and 4 at Euro 2020)
 Most consecutive tournaments with a goal Romelu Lukaku, 4 (1 goal at the 2014 World Cup, 2 goals at Euro 2016, 4 goals at the 2018 World Cup and 4 goals at Euro 2020)
 Most goals at the Olympic Games finals Robert Coppée (in 1920) and Raymond Braine (in 1928), 4 each
 Most goals in an Olympic Games finals match Robert Coppée, 3 goals vs  Spain on 29 August 1920, 1920 Summer Olympics

FIFA World Cup
 Most goals in a single World Cup tournament Romelu Lukaku, 4 (2018)

 Most total goals at World Cup tournaments Marc Wilmots (1998 and 2002) and Romelu Lukaku (2014 and 2018), 5 each
 Most goals in a single World Cup qualifying campaign Romelu Lukaku, 11 (2018)
 Most goals in a single World Cup finals match 
 Bernard Voorhoof, 2 goals vs  Germany on 27 May 1934, 1934 World Cup
 Pol Anoul, 2 goals vs  on 17 June 1954, 1954 World Cup
 Wilfried Van Moer, 2 goals vs  on 3 June 1970, 1970 World Cup
 Marc Wilmots, 2 goals vs  on 20 June 1998, 1998 World Cup
 Romelu Lukaku, 2 goals vs  on 18 June 2018 and 2 goals vs  on 23 June 2018, 2018 World Cup
 Eden Hazard, 2 goals vs  on 23 June 2018, 2018 World Cup

 Most goals in a single World Cup qualifying match Marc Van Der Linden, 4 goals vs  on 1 June 1989, 1990 World Cup qualifying 
 First goal in a World Cup finals match Bernard Voorhoof vs  Germany on 27 May 1934, 1934 World Cup
 First goal in a World Cup qualifying campaign Jean Capelle, vs  on 25 February 1934, 1934 World Cup qualifying

UEFA European Championship
 Most goals in a single European Championship tournament Romelu Lukaku, 4 (2020)
 Most goals in total at European Championship tournaments Romelu Lukaku, 6 (2016 and 2020)
 Most goals in a single European Championship qualifying campaign Nico Claesen (Euro 1988 qualifying) and Romelu Lukaku (Euro 2020 qualifying), 7 each
 Most goals in a single European Championship finals match Romelu Lukaku, 2 goals vs  on 18 June 2016, Euro 2016, and 2 goals vs  on 12 June 2021, Euro 2020
 Most goals in a single European Championship qualifying match 
Jacques Stockman, 3 goals vs  on 19 March 1967, Euro 1968 qualifying
Nico Claesen, 3 goals vs  on 14 October 1986, and 3 goals vs  on 1 April 1987, both Euro 1988 qualifying
 First goal in a European Championship finals match Odilon Polleunis vs  on 14 June 1972, Euro 1972
 First goal in a European Championship qualifying campaign Jacques Stockman vs  on 4 November 1962, Euro 1964 qualifying

Captains
 First captain  Camille Van Hoorden
 Most appearances as captain  Eden Hazard, 59

Most captaincies
The following are the top ten players assigned as captain the most times (at the start of an international game):

Correct as of 1 December 2022, after the match against Croatia.

Highlighted names denote a player still playing or available for selection.

Disciplinary

Red cards
 2 expulsions Eric Deflandre, Vincent Kompany and Axel Witsel

 List of all Belgian players sent off once
Pierre Braine, Mathieu Bollen, Georges Heylens, Pierre Hanon, Walter Meeuws, Alexandre Czerniatynski, Philippe Albert, Pascal Renier, Gert Verheyen, Tjörven De Brul, Marc Wilmots, Filip De Wilde, Olivier De Cock, Bart Goor, Mousa Dembélé, Anthony Vanden Borre, Marouane Fellaini, Nicolas Lombaerts and Steven Defour

 First player to get an expulsion Pierre Braine, vs  on 26 May 1927

 First substitute to get an expulsion Mathieu Bollen, vs  on 19 April 1959

 First player to be expelled by receiving two yellow cards Walter Meeuws, vs  on 14 October 1981

 First substitute to be expelled by receiving two yellow cards None

 Youngest player to get an expulsion Mousa Dembélé, aged 19 years, 2 months and 25 days, vs  on 11 October 2006

 Oldest player to get an expulsion Filip De Wilde, aged 35 years, 11 months and 14 days, vs  on 8 June 2000

 Fastest expulsion by a starting player 27 minutes, Eric Deflandre vs  on 24 March 2001

 Fastest expulsion by a substitute 3 minutes, Alexandre Czerniatynski, vs  on 6 June 1984

 Fastest expulsion by receiving two yellow cards 29 minutes, Eric Deflandre, vs  on 9 October 2004

 Shortest time between two yellow cards 0 minutes, Eric Deflandre, vs  on 9 October 2004

 Highest number of expulsions of Belgian players in a single game 2 expulsions: Eric Deflandre and Bart Goor, vs  on 9 October 2004

 Highest total number of expulsions in a single game 3 expulsions; Georges Heylens, Dobrivoje Trivić and Dragan Džajić, vs  on 16 October 1968

Yellow cards
 First player to get a yellow card  Odilon Polleunis, vs  Spain on 23 February 1969

 First player to get a yellow card as a substitute  François Van der Elst, vs  on 25 April 1976

 Youngest player to get a yellow card  Anthony Vanden Borre, 17 years, 11 months and 14 days, vs  on 8 October 2005

 Oldest player to get a yellow card  Franky Van der Elst, 36 years, 11 months and 23 days, vs  on 22 April 1998

 Highest total of yellow cards received  18, Vincent Kompany

Miscellaneous
 Player born on the earliest date Joseph Romdenne, born in 1876, received his only cap on 14 May 1905 vs 
 First appearance by a player born in the 20th century Cornelius Elst (born on 25 January 1901) on 21 May 1922 vs 
 Last appearance by a player born in the 19th century Nicolas Hoydonckx (born on 29 December 1900) on 26 November 1933 vs 
 First appearance by a player born in the 21st century Yari Verschaeren (born on 12 July 2001) on 9 September 2019 vs 
 First substitute Georges Mathot replaced Charles Cambier after 46 minutes vs  on 26 April 1908
 Earliest time in the game to be substituted off Vincent Kompany, vs  on 7 September 2005, in the 12th minute
 First substitute who was substituted off again in the same game Branko Strupar vs  on 14 May 2002
 Shortest time between being subbed on and being subbed off Christophe Lepoint vs  on 11 August 2010, 15 minutes
 Most substitutions in one game 
 8, vs  on 14 May 2002
 8, vs  on 21 August 2002
 Most simultaneous substitutions 
 6, at half-time vs  on 19 May 1986
 6, at half-time vs  on 14 May 2002
 First game that went into extra time On 30 April 1905, vs 

 Club providing the most Belgian internationals in a single match Anderlecht, 11; in the match vs  on 30 September 1964, all outfield players in the second half were from Anderlecht.
 Belgian players who later became manager/head coach Hector Goetinck, François Demol, André Vandeweyer, Guy Thys, Walter Meeuws, Paul Van Himst, Wilfried Van Moer, Georges Leekens, René Vandereycken, Franky Vercauteren (caretaker) and Marc Wilmots

Penalties
 Most saves in penalty shoot-outs in competitive games Jean-Marie Pfaff, 1 vs  (penalty of Eloy Olaya) on 22 June 1986
 Most saves in penalty shoot-outs, including friendlies Philippe Vande Walle, 2 vs  (penalties by Rob Lee and Les Ferdinand) on 29 May 1998
 Most misses in penalty shoot-outs in competitive games None
 Most misses in penalty shoot-outs, including friendlies Enzo Scifo, 1 vs  on 29 May 1998

Clean sheets

 Most clean sheets Thibaut Courtois, 50
 Most clean sheets in competitive matches Thibaut Courtois, 41
 Most clean sheets in total at the World Cup and European Championship finals Thibaut Courtois, 13 (2 at the 2014 World Cup, 3 at Euro 2016, 3 at the 2018 World Cup, 3 at Euro 2020 and 2 at the 2022 World Cup)
 Most clean sheets in a single World Cup tournament Thibaut Courtois, 3 (2018)
 Most clean sheets in total at World Cup tournaments Thibaut Courtois, 7 (2 in 2014, 3 in 2018 and 2 in 2022)
 Most clean sheets in a single European Championship tournament Thibaut Courtois, 3 (2016 and 2020)
 Most clean sheets in total at European Championship tournaments Thibaut Courtois, 6 (3 in 2016 and 3 in 2020)
 Most clean sheets in a single Olympic Games finals tournament Jean De Bie, 2 (1920)
 Most clean sheets in total at the Olympic Games finals Jean De Bie, 2 (both in 1920)

Footnotes

References

Sources

External links
 RBFA website about all matches
 RSSSF archive of results 1904–
 RSSSF archive of most capped players and highest goalscorers
 The FIFA/Coca-Cola World Ranking
 World Football Elo Ratings
 The Red Devils Archive

 
Records
National association football team records and statistics